Flora Zaibun Majid (6 December 1939 – 30 October 2018) was a Bangladeshi scientist. She was the former chairman of  BCSIR. She contributed to the field of research in botany and nutrition science in Bangladesh. Flora researched over two decades on different topics and specially known for leading the Spirulina project in BCSIR.

Early life and education
Flora is the daughter of M A Majid and Najmannessa Majid. Her father was a civil servant. 
Born in 1939, she suffered from polio when she was nine months old. Flora attended Quamrunnesa School and Eden Mohila College. Flora studied at the Dhaka University and was the first student to receive a First Class Honours in Botany in 1960. She obtained a Fulbright scholarship to study at Michigan State University.

Research and career
She was the first woman and first working scientist to serve as chairman of BCSIR.

Death 
She died on 30 October 2018 at the age of 79.

Awards and honors

References 

1939 births
2018 deaths
Bangladeshi scientists
Bangladeshi women scientists
Eden Mohila College alumni
University of Dhaka alumni
Michigan State University alumni
People from Dhaka